Landscape refers to the visible features of an area of land (usually rural), or a pictorial representation of an area of countryside.

Landscape may also refer to:

Arts and entertainment
 Landscape art, an artwork depicting natural scenery
 Landscape photography
 Landscape (play), by Harold Pinter
 Landscape (film), a 2000 Slovak film directed by Martin Šulík
 Landscape (band), an English jazz-funk-synthpop band active in the 1970s and 80s
 Landscapes (band), a British melodic hardcore band formed in 2009
 Landscapes (Anthony Quintal album), a 2015 compilation album
 Landscape (Art Pepper album)
 Landscape (Kenny Barron album)
 Landscape (Landscape album)
 Landscape (Peter Leitch album), by Peter Leitch (2014)
 Landscapes (Elroy Fritsch album)
 Landscape: Memory, a novel by Matthew Stadler

Other uses
 Landscape format, where the longer axis of printed material is horizontal (as opposed to "portrait")
 Landscape Arch, a natural rock arch in Arches National Park, Utah, United States
 The Landscape Channel, a British TV channel
 Landscape (horse), a British Thoroughbred racehorse
 Landscape (magazine), a magazine on human geography founded by J.B. Jackson
 Landscape, the journal of the Landscape Institute, a British professional body
 Landscape (software), a proprietary web service for centralized management of Ubuntu
 String theory landscape, the exponential number of compactifications in string theory

See also
 Lvndscape, Dutch house music DJ